The Fatherland Socialist Party, also known as the Socialist Party "Fatherland" or Fatherland, is a minor opposition political party in South Ossetia. The part is led by Vyacheslav Gobozov, former head of the committee for information during the administration of Anatoly Bibilov. They position themselves as Socialist and have been considered a marginal radical party for their entire existence. 

The party participated in the 2009 South Ossetian parliamentary election being notable for being the only anti-Russian party to stand for election. They would come in a distant fourth place with 6.53% of the vote and no seats in Parliament. After the election, party leadership would go on to claim that the Pro-Russian parties rigged the election in their favor to prevent any meaningful opposition entering parliament. 

The party would go on to stand during the 2014 South Ossetian parliamentary election garnering 3.26% of the vote and the 2019 South Ossetian parliamentary election receiving 3.20%.

Election results

Parliament

References

Political parties in South Ossetia